Lodewijk Gerard Brocx (31 December 1819, The Hague – 2 December 1880, The Hague) was a Dutch politician.

1819 births
1880 deaths
Ministers of Colonial Affairs of the Netherlands
Royal Netherlands Navy officers
Politicians from The Hague